Roy H. Schoeman (born in 1951 in New York City) is a Jew and author who has converted to the Catholic Church. Due to his decision of faith, he gave up a career in the field of economics and is now devoted to the Christian mission.

Life

Roy Schoeman's Jewish parents fled from Nazi Germany to New York, where he was born and grew up. He received his Jewish education from non-Orthodox rabbis such as Arthur Hertzberg and Arthur Green, who taught at a "non-denominational" rabbinical college in the United States. The charismatic-Hasidic rabbi Shlomo Carlebach also influenced him.

He studied at the Massachusetts Institute of Technology (MIT) and Harvard Business School, where he received an MBA magna cum laude and lectured on marketing. In retrospect, he describes his childhood and youth as very religious, but he left this belief behind in the course of his career. He also talks about an increasing feeling of senselessness despite the success. He attributes his devotion to Christianity to apparitions of the Virgin Mary. He counts the Carthusian priest Marcellin Theeuwes among his Christian teachers.

Today he gives lectures and appears as a conference speaker and on television shows in the Christian field.

Religious theses

In his work The Salvation comes from the Jews, Schoeman has detailed his views on the role of Judaism in the Christian salvation history detailed above. He sees in Christianity the completion of Judaism and therefore would like to invite 

In the Holocaust he suspects diabolic influence and considers the interpretation that this suffering is expiatively preparing the coming return of Christ (parousia). He also traces the influence of National Socialist ideas on Arab rulers and warns of the influence of Muslim anti-Semitism.

Praise and criticism

Cardinal Raymond Leo Burke praised Schoeman's book, Honey from the Rock:

Schoeman's statements on the mission to the Jews were also criticized from various sides. Though Schoeman's statements are philosemitic, he was also criticized on the Jewish side for his capture of Judaism.

Publications

 Role of Judaism in salvation history, Steubenville, Ohio: Franciscan University of Steubenville, 2004.
 Salvation Is from the Jews, Ignatius Press, 2004, German: Salvation comes from the Jews. God's plan for his people (Augsburg 2007).
 https://web.archive.org/web/20071029044625/http://www.christenundjuden.org///de/?item=589
 Honey from the rock. Sixteen Jews Find the Sweetness of Christ, Ignatius Press, 2007, .
 Judaism: from the Catholic perspective, London: Catholic Truth Society, 2008, .

References

External links 
 
 Schoemans Homepage salvationisfromthejews.com
 Channel on YouTube
 "Jews Demand Signs" An Interview with Roy Schoeman by Carl E. Olson (2007), on ignatiusinsight.com
 Interview with Roy Schoeman on seattlecatholic.com
 Conversion Story on catholiceducation.org

1951 births
20th-century American Jews
American Roman Catholics
Converts to Roman Catholicism from Judaism
Harvard University faculty
Harvard Business School alumni
Living people
21st-century American Jews